Put Up Your Hands is a 1919 American silent comedy film directed by Edward Sloman and written by L. V. Jefferson. The film stars Margarita Fischer, George Periolat, and Emory Johnson. The film was released on March 16, 1919, by  Pathé Exchange.

Plot

Cast
{| 
! style="width: 180px; text-align: left;" |  Actor
! style="width: 230px; text-align: left;" |  Role
|- style="text-align: left;"
|Margarita Fischer||Olive Barton
|-
|George Periolat||Peter Barton
|-
|Emory Johnson||Emory Hewitt
|-
|Hayward Mack||Alvin Thorne
|-
|William V. Mong||'Highball' Hazelitt
|-
|J. Gordon Russell||Three Gun Smith
|-
|Kate Price||Bridget
|-
|Marian Lee||Undetermined Role
|-
|}

References

External links

American silent feature films
American black-and-white films
Associated Exhibitors films
Films directed by Edward Sloman
1910s English-language films
1910s American films